Evi Marandi, stage name of Eyh Maranih (born 7 August 1941) is a naturalized-Italian actress born in Greece, active from 1959 until 1974.

Life and career 
Marandi was born in Athens, the daughter of a banker. After studying acting at Actors Studio in New York, Marandi moved to Italy in 1961, where she became a star of B-movies and genre films. Marandi has been credited with many aliases, including Evy Harandis, Evy Marandys, and Evi Morandi.

Selected filmography
 Revenge of the Barbarians (1960)
 Totòtruffa 62 (1961)
 Leoni al sole (1961)
 Planet of the Vampires (1965)
 Agent 077: From the Orient with Fury (1965)
 I figli del leopardo (1965)
 James Tont operazione U.N.O. (1965)
 Tres dólares de plomo (1965)
 Agent 3S3: Massacre in the Sun (1966)
 Our Men in Bagdad (1966)
 The Tough One (1966)
 Goldface, the Fantastic Superman (1967) 
 Man of the Year (1971)
 The Silkworm (1973)

Television
 Ironside (TV Series) Episode entitled "The Monster of Comus Towers" (1967)

References

External links 
 

Italian film actresses
20th-century Italian actresses
1941 births
Living people
Actresses from Athens
Greek emigrants to Italy